Pádraig Ó Finneadha (23 January 1913 – 18 November 1986) was an Irish scholar and doctor.

Born at Lochán Beag, Indreabhán, County Galway, to Micheál Ó Finneadha and Bríd Ní Fhualáin, he graduated from National University of Ireland, Galway, in 1938. He worked in countries such as Nigeria, the United Kingdom and Uganda.

External links
 O'FINNEADHA, Patrick (1913–1986))

People from County Galway
Irish folklorists
1913 births
1986 deaths
20th-century Irish people
21st-century Irish people
Alumni of the National University of Ireland
Irish-language writers